My Own Country is Abraham Verghese's first book.  First published in 1994, it made that year's New York Times Notable Book list. It is used in colleges and medical schools throughout North America and across the world because of the way it communicates the sense of empathy and compassion so often missing in medical school education in an era of high technology and reliance on computers as primary diagnostic tools.

Plot
My Own Country traces the story of a young infectious-disease physician in the mid-1980s in Johnson City, Tennessee, who began to treat patients with a then unknown disease. Because of the seemingly un-ending influx of patients with the same symptoms and for whom there was, as yet, no effective treatment, Dr. Verghese became, of necessity, the town's AIDS expert. As much as he gave to his patients in terms of caring and empathetic treatment, he gained back in terms of understanding and lasting lessons in how to heal when there is no cure. Often, he was the only one at his patients' bedside when family and friends, fearful of or in denial about the disease stayed away. From the sorrow of so many deaths and ugly displays of prejudice, from his giving of so much time and comfort, and the unraveling of his own domestic life and from the seeming hopelessness of the situation came a book of such richness and humanity that the story is uplifting and hopeful even as it plumbs the depths of human sadness.

Adaptations
The book was adapted for a 1998 TV movie starring Naveen Andrews.

External links 
 

1994 non-fiction books
Medical literature
HIV/AIDS in literature
HIV/AIDS in American films